Villaseco de los Gamitos is a village and municipality in the province of Salamanca,  western Spain, part of the autonomous community of Castile-Leon. It is located 40 kilometres from the provincial capital city of Salamanca and has a population of 143 people as of 2016.

Geography
The municipality covers an area of 12.32 km². It lies 835 metres above sea level and the postal code is 37114.

See also
List of municipalities in Salamanca

References

Municipalities in the Province of Salamanca